Fathi Ali Abdel Rahman (born 16 April 1932) is an Egyptian boxer. He competed in the welterweight division at the 1952 Summer Olympics.

References

1932 births
Living people
Boxers at the 1952 Summer Olympics
Egyptian male boxers
Olympic boxers of Egypt
Mediterranean Games medalists in boxing
Welterweight boxers
Boxers at the 1951 Mediterranean Games
Mediterranean Games silver medalists for Egypt
20th-century Egyptian people